The Battle of Cambronal was a major battle during the years after the Dominican War of Independence and was fought on 22 December 1855, in Cambronal, near Neiba. A detachment of Dominican troops forming part of the Army of the South, led by General Francisco Sosa, defeated an outnumbering force of the Haitian Army led by General Pierre Rivere Garat.

Notes

References
 

Cambronal